Shahr-e Bazi (formerly known as Luna Park), was an amusement park located in the north of Tehran. Covering , it was the largest amusement park in the Islamic Republic of Iran and admitted around 2.5 million visitors every year. It has been closed since 2007 due to highway construction, lack of inspection, and malfunctions.

The amusement park was opened in 1970 under the last Shah of Iran. It was built by Abbas Pedarsani. It became a state-owned park after the Iran–Iraq War in 1988. In the following years, the state-owned park was made more technologically advanced.

Shahr-e Bazi featured twelve thrill rides, as well as a cinema and theater. There were also six restaurants with different food from around the world. Souvenir shops and a money exchange office were located around the park. One of the main reasons for the park's popularity were its water slides and pools.

The park was open 10 months a year, during spring, summer and autumn. During winter, heavy snow made it necessary to keep the park closed. Admission was around $3 for adults, whereas children under seven could get in free.

References 

Amusement parks in Iran
Defunct amusement parks
Buildings and structures in Tehran
Tourist attractions in Tehran
1970 establishments in Iran
2007 disestablishments in Iran